Nawabzada Iftikhar Ahmed Khan Babar is a Pakistani politician who has been a member of the National Assembly of Pakistan since August 2018. He is the son of Nawabzada Nasrullah Khan. He has been appointed Special Assistant to PM Shahbaz Sharif.

Political career
Iftikhar Khan first joined the PML-Q in 2005 and later PML-N after the 2008 elections. Before the 2013 elections, he joined the Pakistan Peoples Party (PPP).

Babar served as divisional president of the PPP for Dera Ghazi Khan.

He was elected to the National Assembly of Pakistan from Constituency NA-184 (Muzaffargarh-IV) as a candidate of the PPP in the 2018 Pakistani general election. He received 54,879 votes and defeated Malik Ahmad Karim Qaswar Langrial.

Family Tree

References

Living people
Pakistani MNAs 2018–2023
Pakistan People's Party politicians
Year of birth missing (living people)
People from Muzaffargarh
Politicians from Muzaffargarh